Centrostephanus sylviae is a species of sea urchins of the family Diadematidae. Their armour is covered with spines. Centrostephanus sylviae was first scientifically described in 1975 by Koehler.

References 

Diadematidae
Animals described in 1975